The 2006 Eurospeedway Lausitz Superbike World Championship round was the tenth round of the 2006 Superbike World Championship. It took place on the weekend of September 8–10, 2006 at the EuroSpeedway Lausitz.

Results

Superbike race 1 classification

Superbike race 2 classification

Supersport race classification

References
 Superbike Race 1
 Superbike Race 2
 Supersport Race

Eurospeedway
Eurospeedway Lausitz Superbike